Zamaane Ko Dikhana Hai (translation: Show The World) is a 1981 Indian Hindi romantic thriller film produced and directed by Nasir Hussain. It stars Rishi Kapoor, Padmini Kolhapure, Yogeeta Bali, Amjad Khan, Kader Khan, Shreeram Lagoo in pivotal roles.  The film flopped and Hussain blamed the arrival of video in the early 1980s for the film's failure and that it deserved a better fate.

Overview
The film was Padmini's debut film as a lead actress. She had earlier worked as a child artist and as a supporting actress in Insaaf Ka Tarazu.

The music, composed by Rahul Dev Burman with lyrics by Majrooh Sultanpuri, was successful, but the movie itself did not have the success associated with a Nasir Hussain production, with his last three films being major hits (Hum Kisise Kum Naheen, Yaadon Ki Baaraat and Caravan.)

The film took scenes from all previous Nasir Hussain productions and redid them as a part of the story, including the train top song (song being different) from his first production Jab Pyar Kisi Se Hota Hai, the runaway girl from Caravan and the song contest from Hum Kisise Kum Naheen.
A remake of this film is being considered for release in 2022 under the title "Covid ko hatana hai".

Plot
Wealthy industrialist, Nanda, is enraged when he finds out that his eldest son, Ramesh, has fallen in love with a poor woman, Seema, and wants to marry her. He asks his son that if he marries her, he will exclude him from his will. In answer to that, Ramesh marries Seema and leaves the Nanda household. When Nanda's younger son, Ravi, returns home, he is told that his brother is away on business. Ravi does find out that Ramesh had been asked to leave by their father. He manages to convince his dad to change his mind about Ramesh, and sets off to find Ramesh. He finds out that Ramesh and Seema are no longer alive, but Seema had given birth to a son, and left him in the care of her sister, Kanchan. Ravi meets Kanchan, and both fall in love with each other. When Kanchan finds out that Ravi is Nanda's son, she is angry, and refuses to have to do anything with Ravi, as she is sure that she too will be rejected by Nanda, when he finds out that she is poor, and related to Seema. What Ravi and Kanchan don't know that Nanda has an ulterior motive, as he wants to adopt Ramesh's son - by hook or by crook.

Cast
 Rishi Kapoor as Ravi Nanda
 Padmini Kolhapure as Kanchan / Bahadur
 Yogeeta Bali as Razia Khan
 Amjad Khan as Shareef Khan / Sharafat Ali / Karamat Ali / Salamat Ali / Wajahat Ali
 Kader Khan as Shekhar Nanda
 Om Shivpuri as Colonel I. M. Tipsee
 Simple Kapadia as Kanchan Tipsee
 Shreeram Lagoo as S. K. Nanda
 Neelam Mehra as Kavita
 Viju Khote as Ranjeet
 Tariq Khan as Robin Nanda   
 Randhir Kapoor as Ramesh Nanda (Special Appearance)

Soundtrack
The music was composed by Rahul Dev Burman, also known as R.D. Burman, with lyrics by Majrooh Sultanpuri.

Track list

Notable songs

The most well known song from the film is "Puchho Na Yaar Kya Hua" by Mohammad Rafi and Asha Bhosle. The melodious song was a major hit in India at the time.

In recent years, the soundtrack has received attention for "Dil Lena Khel Hai Dildar Ka," a synthesized, minimalist, electronic dance/disco song. It has been described as having "a very futuristic electro feel" and approaching a "techno wavelength." The song has been cited as a possible influence on the 1982 proto-acid house album Synthesizing: Ten Ragas to a Disco Beat by Charanjit Singh.

References

External links
 

1981 films
1980s Hindi-language films
Films scored by R. D. Burman
Films directed by Nasir Hussain